The Battle of Amba Aradam (also known as the Battle of Enderta) was a battle fought on the northern front of what was known as the Second Italo-Abyssinian War. This battle consisted of attacks and counter-attacks by Italian forces under Marshal of Italy Pietro Badoglio and Ethiopian forces under Ras Mulugeta Yeggazu. This battle was primarily fought in the area around Amba Aradam which included most of Enderta Province.

Background 
On 3 October 1935, General Emilio De Bono advanced into Ethiopia from Eritrea without a declaration of war. De Bono had a force of approximately 100,000 Italian soldiers, and 25,000 Eritrean soldiers to advance towards Addis Ababa. In December, after a brief period of inactivity and minor setbacks for the Italians, De Bono was replaced by Badoglio.

Haile Selassie launched the Christmas Offensive late in the year to test Badoglio. By mid-January 1936, Badoglio was ready to renew the Italian advance on the Ethiopian capital. Badoglio ultimately overwhelmed the armies of ill-armed and uncoordinated Ethiopian warriors with mustard gas, tankettes, and heavy artillery.

Prelude 
In early January 1936, the Ethiopian forces were in the hills overlooking the Italian positions and attacking them regularly. Italian dictator Benito Mussolini was impatient for an Italian offensive to get underway and for the Ethiopians to be swept from the field.

The Ethiopians facing the Italians were in three groupings. In the centre, near Abbi Addi and along the Beles River in the Tembien, were Ras Kassa Haile Darge with approximately 40,000 men and Ras Seyoum Mangasha with about 30,000 men. On the Ethiopian right was Ras Mulugeta and his army of approximately 80,000 men in positions atop Amba Aradam. Ras Imru Haile Selassie with approximately 40,000 men was on the Ethiopian left in the area around Seleh Leha in Shire Province.

Badoglio had five army corps at his disposal. On his right, he had the IV Army Corps and the II Army Corps facing Ras Imru in the Shire. In the Italian centre was the Eritrean Corps facing Ras Kassa and Ras Seyoum in the Tembien. Facing Ras Mulugeta atop Amba Aradam was the I Army Corps and the III Army Corps.

Initially, Badoglio saw the destruction of Ras Mulugeta's army as his first priority. Mulugeta's force would have to be dislodged from its strong positions on Amba Aradam in order for the Italians to continue the advance towards Addis Ababa. But Ras Kassa and Ras Seyoumm were exerting such pressure from the Tembien that Badoglio decided that he would have to deal with them first. If the Ethiopian centre was successful, the I Army Corps and III Army Corps facing Mulugeta would be cut off from reinforcement and resupply.

From 20 to 24 January, the First Battle of Tembien was fought. The outcome of this battle was inconclusive, but the threat Ras Kassa posed to the I Army Corps and III Army Corps was neutralized.

On 9 February, Marshal Badoglio held a press conference at his headquarters and announced that the mighty obstacle that blocked the road to Addis Ababa was about to be liquidated. Badoglio was talking of course about Ras Mulugeta and his army dug in atop Amba Aradam. The mountain was of two parts. There was a jagged ridge known to the Italians as "The Herringbone" and, on the extreme right, a flat-topped peak called "The Priest's Hat." The land around the base of the mountain was known as the Enderta. An article in a then-current issue of Time magazine indicated that the correspondents on the Italian side were provided with a high-powered telescope to watch the progress of the battle.

While their forces were roughly equal, Badoglio held an overwhelming material advantage over Mulugeta. The Italians attacking Amba Aradam had more than 5,000 machine guns, 280 pieces of artillery, and 170 airplanes. By contrast, the Ethiopians had about 400 machine guns, 18 old field pieces of medium calibre, a small number of anti-aircraft guns, and no planes. Mulugeta's one advantage was the steep slopes of Amba Arada.

Battle 
At 8:00 am on 10 February, Badoglio launched the Battle of Amba Aradam. Royal Italian Army and Blackshirts led the Italian advance. Native Askaris, on which De Bono had leaned so heavily, formed the reserve. The Italian I Army Corps and III Army Corps advanced across the Kalamino Plain. By nightfall, both corps were established on the banks of the May Gabat River.

Badoglio was an artilleryman first and last. As a result, he fought a gunner's battle. His headquarters was also the Italian artillery observation post and about every five minutes scout planes of the Regia Aeronautica went out to circle the front. The planes identified the locations of Ethiopian forces for the Italian gunners. But the Ethiopians fighting for Ras Mulugeta were regular drilled and uniformed troops. They had artillery too and knew how to use it.

The Italian scout planes also mapped out the area around Amba Aradam and discovered a weakness in Ras Mulugeta's defences. Air photographs showed that an attack from the Plain of Hintalo to the south of Amba Aradam should be uncontested. As a result of this discovery, Badoglio planned to encircle Amba Aradam and attack Mulugeta from the rear after his forces linked up at Hintalo.

On 11 February, the 4th CC.NN. Division "3 Gennaio" and the 5th Alpine Division "Pusteria" of the I Army Corps advanced from May Gabat moving towards and around the west side of Amba Aradam. At the same time, the III Army Corps moved towards and around the east side of Amba Aradam. Too late Ras Mulugeta realized the Italian plan to encircle his positions.

On the afternoon of 12 February, a large Ethiopian force streamed down the western slopes of Amba Aradam and attacked the 3rd CC.NN. Division "21 Aprile". The Blackshirts were held up, but the Pusteria Division continued its advance towards Hintalo. The near-continuous and persistent air and artillery bombardment of the Ethiopian positions had sapped the Ethiopians of much of their will to resist.

On the evening of 14 February, the Italian pincers were about to snap shut. As the encircling forces reached specified positions, they formed up, re-grouped, and positioned their artillery for the final assault.

By the morning of 15 February, under cover of darkness and dense cloud, the Italians completed the encirclement of Amba Aradam. When daylight came and the clouds lifted, the Ethiopians were reinvigorated by the sight of their predicament. They swarmed down the western slopes of Amba Aradam towards Addi Kolo. The Ethiopians attacked the Italians at the western base of Amba Aradam again and again. But the Italian artillery and air power negated the fury of the Ethiopian assault. By darkness, the battle was practically over.

Ras Mulugeta guessed that the Italians would take Amba Aradam by first attacking "The Priest's Hat". He guessed wrong. The Italians attacked and secured the lightly held Ethiopian positions on "The Herringbone" which made defence of the "Priest's Hat" untenable. For political reasons, the 1st CC.NN. Division "23 Marzo" was given the honour of hoisting the Italian flag atop Amba Aradam.

The Ethiopians had managed to create a break in the Italian line around Addi Kolo. Through this break, the army of Ras Mulugeta made its escape as it fell back towards Amba Alagi and Sokota. Mulugeta planned to reassemble his forces around Amba Alagi.

Aftermath 
Badoglio unleashed the full power of the Italian Air Force on the fleeing army of Ras Mulugeta. For four consecutive days, forty tons of mustard gas was dropped on the hapless fugitives. In addition to this, the local Azebu Galla were bribed by the Italians to attack the Ethiopian stragglers.

Tadessa Mulugeta, Ras Mulugeta's son, was the asmach on Amba Aradam. He was killed in an action against a party of Galla and his body was mutilated by them. When Ras Mulugeta received news of this outrage, he turned back and was killed by a strafing plane. Attacked from both above and from the ground, what was left of the army of Ras Mulugeta dissolved.

Badoglio now turned his attention from the Ethiopian right back to the Ethiopian centre and Ras Kassa and Ras Seyoum. It was time to finish what had been started at the First Battle of Tembien. The result was the Second Battle of Tembien.

In popular culture 
The corrupted form ambaradàn entered Italian language with the meaning of 'messy, complex situation'.

See also 
 Ethiopian Order of Battle Second Italo-Abyssinian War
 Army of the Ethiopian Empire
List of Second Italo-Ethiopian War weapons of Ethiopia
 Italian Order of Battle Second Italo-Abyssinian War
 Royal Italian Army
List of Italian military equipment in the Second Italo-Ethiopian War

Notes

References

Bibliography

External links 

1936 in Ethiopia
Conflicts in 1936
Battles of the Second Italo-Ethiopian War
Battles involving Ethiopia
Battles involving Italy
February 1936 events